Analy High School (formerly West County High School) is a public high school in Sebastopol, Sonoma County, California. It was established in 1908 as Analy High School. In 2021 Analy merged with El Molino High School and was known under the working name West County High School for one year, before returning to its original name.

The school is located in what used to be called Analy Township, which derived its name from the Annaly Ranch which was located in the township in the 1840s, which in turn was named for an Annaly in Ireland, which had connections to the settler Jasper O'Farrell.

The school and several facilities, including the library and some classrooms were used as the setting of the popular Netflix TV show 13 Reasons Why, in which the school is called Liberty High School.

History
The school was established  in 1908 in the town of Sebastopol.  It is primarily a college preparatory school.

Although the town's population is small, the school serves an area of 50,000. The town it serves has changed from a rural community to a more suburban community in recent decades; many residents commute to metropolitan areas. Approximately 85% go directly to two or four-year colleges; the school ranks in the 98th percentile on sending students to two or four-year public schools.

Analy was one of two comprehensive high schools in the West Sonoma County Union High School District, the other being El Molino High School in Forestville, California. The two school were consolidated on the Analy campus in 2021, with the district using the working name West County High School pending rebranding. As of August 28, 2021 the rebranding had not happened. The school operated under the West County High School name for the 2021–2022 school year, and reverted to Analy High School for the 2022–2023 school year.

Curriculum
The school has a seven-period day and offers a wide variety of electives, including 11 programs in practical arts, and provides an almost entirely untracked curriculum for all students and a full range of AP and Honors classes in the five academic areas.

Students participate actively in athletics, performing arts, and debate. There are thirteen clubs with a total membership of over 600 students. 30% of the student population is involved in the band, choir, or theater departments.

AP and honors courses
Fifteen AP courses and five honors courses are offered

AP Capstone Program
 AP Seminar
 AP Research

Laboratory science
 AP Biology
 AP Physics B
 AP Physics C
 Chemistry Honors
 AP Environmental Science

Mathematics
 AP Calculus AB
 AP Statistics
 Trigonometry/Pre-Calculus Honors

English language
 AP English Language and Composition
 AP English Literature and Composition
 English 10 Honors

Foreign language
 Spanish 4 Honors
 French 4 Honors

Social studies
 AP World History (for 10th grade)
 AP U.S. History (for 11th grade)
 AP U.S. Government and Politics (for 12th grade, one semester)
 AP Microeconomics (for 12th grade, one semester)
 AP Psychology

Demographics
The school served 1,141 students in the 2019–2020 academic year (prior to its consolidation with El Molino High School).

Athletics 
The school has over 600 athletes on 38 teams in 21 sports each year. In 2009, the varsity boys' basketball team won the NCS Division III Final for the first time in the school's 101-year history. Other sports offered include football, volleyball, cross country, soccer, softball, baseball, swimming, tennis, golf, track and field, wrestling, and badminton.

Music

Band
There are four band classes and one orchestra class, with an average combined student participation of well over 200. The school has one of the highest instrumental music students per capita ratios in the State of California.

The bands include a 0 period jazz band that starts at 6:45am every morning, an intermediate band, advanced band, honor band, and an orchestra.

The bands perform in two scheduled concerts per year and host the annual Band Wagon Fall Festival. The bands annually perform the national anthem at a San Francisco Giants game, travel to southern California to participate in the Disney Magic Music Days main street parade, and march in the local Apple Blossom Festival Parade.

Once a week, the orchestra winds and percussion meet at 6:00pm and adjourn at 7:30pm for rehearsal. The band has won numerous awards for their jazz, concert and orchestra programs. The jazz band and orchestra annually participate in the California Music Educators Association festivals and competitions.

In 2011, the school orchestra was given a unanimous superior rating at a California Music Educators Association (CMEA) festival at Sonoma State University, the highest rating possible; this was the second consecutive year that the orchestra earned this honor.

Choir
West County High School choir department performs three concerts each year. The first concert is performed in the fall, the second in the winter, and the third in the spring. The choir department is divided into different choirs, which perform music at differing styles and levels of complexity.

Concert Choir: This is the beginning level choir, and it has no prerequisite to join. It primarily consists of freshmen and sophomores, though it is not limited to younger students.
Treble Choir: This is an all-female chorus. It is the second level for female singers, and students are required to audition before joining the treble choir.
Honor Choir: This is the advanced mixed-voice chorus. It is also an audition-only choir, and usually consists of singers who have graduated from the concert or treble choirs. The group is not limited though, and singers with potential are encouraged to audition even without experience in the previous two choirs.
Vocal Ensemble: This is not an actual course. It is a small group (usually consisting of 8-12 singers) that rehearses outside of class hours, usually once a week. This group often tackles music that is considered more challenging, both in technical and vocal facets, also consisting wholly of songs that are performed a cappella. Auditions for the group are held early in the year, and are limited to students in the Honor Choir. The Vocal Ensemble is a relatively new facet of the Choir Department, and was created in 2002.

During the 2009/10 school year, the West County High School High School Honor Choir was selected by DCINY to sing the entire piece of Faure's Requiem Mass at the Lincoln Center in New York City. The concert was set to take place in April, 2010; however, the show was cancelled in October. Another show was set up at Carnegie Hall during the same time period, and the choir was to sing songs directed by contemporary composer Eric Whitacre. This was the first such cross country trip encountered by the West County High School Honor Choir.

Each winter, the Honor Choir has traditionally performed the Hallelujah Chorus from Handel's Messiah as the last song of the evening. Alumni of the honor choir are invited to join the chorus on stage to perform with the choir.
Every spring, several graduating seniors are selected to direct a song each. They are given their choice of songs, and rehearse with their choir, as conductor, in place of Mr. Del Monte. They conduct their pieces on the night of the Spring Concert.
Each Graduation Day, the Honor Choir performs a song for the graduating seniors.

Speech and debate
The school's Speech and Debate team is a member of the Golden Gate Speech Association league, the California High School Speech Association (CHSSA), National Parliamentary Debate League (NPDL) and the National Speech and Debate Association (formerly the National Forensics League).

Awards
Newsweek ranked the school #184 on their list of the top 500 high schools in the country for 2011, #95 for 2014 (the highest-ranked Californian school north of San Francisco), and #352 for 2016. It has been was named a California Distinguished School four times: in 1986, 1994, 1999, and 2009.

Notable alumni
Cameron Britton, actor
Bennett Davison, basketball player
 Cary Fukunaga, director
Jerry Garcia, founding member of the band The Grateful Dead
Greyson Gunheim, professional football player with the Oakland Raiders
Garrett Hill, professional baseball player with the Detroit Tigers
Willard F. Libby, creator of radiocarbon dating and Nobel laureate
Matt Nix, creator of popular television shows Burn Notice and The Good Guys
Mike Nott, professional football player for the Kansas City Chiefs
Jim Thornton, professional football player with the Chicago Bears
Karen Valentine, Emmy Award-winning actress, star of films and television series Room 222

References

External links
Official website

High schools in Sonoma County, California
Sebastopol, California
Educational institutions established in 1908
Public high schools in California
1908 establishments in California